This is a list of British words not widely used in the United States. In Ireland, Canada, New Zealand, India, South Africa, and Australia, some of the British terms listed are used, although another usage is often preferred.

 Words with specific British English meanings that have different meanings in American and/or additional meanings common to both languages (e.g. pants, cot) are to be found at List of words having different meanings in American and British English. When such words are herein used or referenced, they are marked with the flag [DM] (different meaning).
 Asterisks (*) denote words and meanings having appreciable (that is, not occasional) currency in American English, but are nonetheless notable for their relatively greater frequency in British speech and writing.
 British English spelling is consistently used throughout the article, except when explicitly referencing American terms.

0–9
 999  Pronounced "nine nine nine", the UK Emergency phone number (US 911)

A
 abseil  to descend on a rope (US rappel)
Action Man  the action figure toy sold in the US as G.I. Joe.
 agony aunt or uncle  (informal) the author of an agony column (US advice columnist or Dear Abby)
 agony column  (informal) a newspaper or magazine column providing advice to readers' personal problems (US advice column)
 aeroplane any fixed-wing aircraft (US airplane)
 afters dessert, informal
 "all change"  the public-transportation announcement for the last stop (US All out)
 amongst a synonym of among acceptable in British English while seeming old fashioned or pretentious in American English
 anorak a hooded coat (US parka); a socially impaired obsessive, particularly trainspotters (US geek, trekkie, otaku, etc.)
 answerphone  an automated telephone-answering machine, from the trademark Ansafone (US & UK answering machine)
 anti-clockwise, anticlockwise  the direction opposite to clockwise (US counterclockwise).
 approved school  (informal) a reform school for juvenile delinquents, from their pre-1969 designation; juvenile detention centres, whether Secure Training Centres for 15- to 18-year-olds or Young Offender Institutions for 18- to 21-year-olds (US juvie)
 argy-bargy  (informal) a noisy disagreement ranging from a verbal dispute to pushing-and-shoving or outright fighting.
 arse  buttocks, backside or anus (more vulgar than US ass)
 (fall) arse over tit  (vulgar) to fall head over heels
 (be) arsed  (informal) to be made to get off one's arse, usually as a negative or conditional (US be bothered to)
 artic  an abbreviation of "articulated lorry" (US semi)
 as at (before dates) on a particular date
 aubergine US eggplant (both the fruit and colour)
 Auntie or Auntie Beeb (affectionate) the BBC
 autocue  an automated system for providing scripts to actors and orators, from a genericised trademark (US teleprompter)

B
 balls-up  (vulgar, though possibly not in origin) error, mistake, SNAFU. See also cock-up. (US: fuck up, screw up, mess up)
 bank holiday  a statutory holiday when banks and most businesses are closed  (national holiday; state holiday in U.S.)
 bap soft bread roll or a sandwich made from it (this itself is a regional usage in the UK rather than a universal one); in plural, breasts (vulgar slang e.g. "get your baps out, love"); a person's head (Northern Ireland).
 barmaid *, barman  a woman or man who serves drinks in a bar. Barman and the originally American bartender appeared within a year of each other (1837 and 1836); barmaid is almost two centuries older (circa 1658).
 barmy  crazy, unbalanced (US: balmy)
 barney  a noisy quarrel, trouble; origin unknown.
 barrister *  In England, Wales, and Northern Ireland, this used to be the only type of lawyer qualified to argue a case in both higher and lower law courts; contrasts with solicitor. For Scotland, see advocate. Occasionally used in the U.S., but not to define any particular type of lawyer.
 bedsit (or bedsitter)  one-room flat that serves as a living room, kitchen and bedroom and with shared bathroom facilities (US: see SRO; compare studio apartment (in British English a studio apartment – sometimes 'studio flat' – would have a self-contained bathroom)' efficiency)
 Beeb, the Beeb  (affectionate slang) the BBC (British Broadcasting Corporation). See also 'Auntie' (above). The British band Queen released an album called At the Beeb in the UK and it had to be called "At the BBC" for US release.
 Belisha beacon  orange ball, containing a flashing light or now sometimes surrounded by a flashing disc of LEDs, mounted on a post at each end of a zebra crossing (q.v.); named after the UK Minister of Transport Leslie Hore-Belisha who introduced them in 1934.
 bell-end  the glans penis (slang, vulgar), a term of abuse.
 berk, burk or burke  a mildly derogatory term for a fool or stupid person. An abbreviation of either 'Berkshire Hunt' or 'Berkeley Hunt', rhyming slang for cunt.
 bespoke * custom-made to a buyer's specification (US:custom-made)
 bevvy  an alcoholic beverage
 biccie, bicky, bikky  a biscuit (US: "cookie")
 big girl's blouse  a man or a boy who behaves in a way which other men think is how a woman would behave, especially if they show they are frightened of something
 bint  a condescending and sometimes derogatory term for a woman (from the Arabic for 'daughter'). Usage varies with a range of harshness from 'bitch', referring to a disagreeable and domineering woman, to only a slightly derogatory term for a young woman.
 biro   a ballpoint pen. Named after its Hungarian inventor László Bíró and the eponymous company which first marketed them. (US: "Bic")

 bits and bobs  sundry items to purchase, pick up, etc. (e.g. whilst grocery shopping); Britain and US: odds and ends
 black pudding  (US: blood sausage)
 blag  (slang) to obtain or achieve by deception and/or ill preparation, to bluff, to scrounge, to rob, to wing it. A scam, tall story or deception. Derived from the French word blague.
 bleeder  derogatory term used in place of bloke ("what's that stupid bleeder done now?"); use has declined in recent years.
 blimey  (informal) an exclamation of surprise. (Originally gor blimey, a euphemism for God blind me, but has generally lost this connotation.)
 block of flats  a large building divided into flats (apartment building in U.S.) 
 bloke  (informal) man, fellow. e.g. Terry is a top bloke. Also common in Australia and New Zealand. (US and UK also: guy, US dude).
 blower  telephone
 blues and twos  (slang) emergency vehicle with lights and sirens (emergency services in the UK generally use blue flashing lights and formerly used a two-tone siren) (US: lights and sirens or code)
 bobby  police officer, named after Sir Robert Peel, the founder of the Metropolitan Police in 1829. The word "peeler" of similar origin, is used in Northern Ireland.
 Bob's your uncle  "there you go", "it's that simple". (Some areas of US have the phrase Bob's your uncle, Fanny's your aunt)
 bod  a person 
 bodge a cheap or poor (repair) job, can range from inelegant but effective to outright failure. e.g. "You properly bodged that up" ("you really made a mess of that"). (US: kludge, botch or cob, shortened form of cobble) See Bodger.
 boffin  an expert, such as a scientist or engineer
 bog roll (roll of) toilet ("bog") paper (slang).
 bog-standard * completely ordinary, run-of-the-mill, unadulterated, unmodified. (US vanilla, garden-variety).
 boiled sweet type of confection (US: hard candy)
 bollocks  (vulgar; originally ballocks, colloquially also spelled as bollox) testicles; verbal rubbish (as in "you're talking bollocks") (US: bullshit). The somewhat similar bollix is found in American English, but without the anatomical connotations or vulgar sense meaning 'mess up'. The twin pulley blocks at the top of a ship's mast are also known as bollocks, and in the 18th century priests' sermons were colloquially referred to as bollocks; it was by claiming this last usage that the Sex Pistols prevented their album Never Mind the Bollocks from being banned under British obscenity laws. Related phrases include bollocksed, which means either tired ("I'm bollocksed!") or broken beyond repair; bollocks up, meaning to mess up ("He really bollocksed that up"); and [a] bollocking, meaning a stern telling off. Compare dog's bollocks, below
 bonce   head (informal)
 bone-idle *  lazy
 botty, bot  a person's bottom (informal or childish)
 brass monkeys  cold – from "cold enough to freeze the balls off a brass monkey". According to a popular folk etymology, this phrase derives from cannonballs stowed on a brass triangle named after a "powder monkey" (a boy who runs gunpowder to the ship's guns) spilling owing to the frame's contraction in cold weather. (This is however incorrect for several physical and linguistic reasons.) The phrase is a 20th-century variant of earlier expressions referring to other body parts, especially the nose and tail, indicating that the brass monkey took the form of a real monkey.
 brekkie, brekky  (slang) synonym of breakfast
 breve  (musical) a note of two bars' length (or a count of 8) in 4/4 time (US: double whole note)
 bristols  (vulgar, rhyming slang) breasts; from football team Bristol City = titty
 brolly  (informal) umbrella
 brown bread  (rhyming slang) dead; "You're brown bread, mate!"
 browned off  Fed up, annoyed or out of patience.
 bubble and squeak  dish of cooked cabbage fried with cooked potatoes and other vegetables. Often made from the remains of the Sunday roast trimmings.
 budgerigar or (colloquial) budgie  a small Australian parrot (US: not distinguished from other parakeets)
 buggered  (vulgar, literally a synonym for 'sodomised') worn out; broken; thwarted, undermined, in a predicament, e.g. "If we miss the last bus home, we're buggered" (US: screwed). Also used to indicated lack of motivation as in "I can't be buggered". (US: "I can't be bothered.")
 bugger all  little or nothing at all; "I asked for a pay rise and they gave me bugger all"; "I know bugger all about plants"; damn all. US: zip, jack or (offensive) jack shit. Usage is rare in the US.
 building society  an institution, owned by its depositors rather than shareholders, that provides mortgage loans and other financial services (US equivalent: savings and loan association)
 bum bag  a bag worn on a strap around the waist (US: fanny [DM] pack)
 bumble  to wander aimlessly or stroll/walk without urgency to a destination; usually synonymous with amble when used in the US.
 bumf, bumph  useless paperwork or documentation (from "bum fodder", toilet paper)
 bunce  a windfall; profit; bonus
 bureau de change  an office where money can be exchanged (US: currency exchange)
 burgle * (originally colloquial, back-formation from burglar) to commit burglary (in the US, burglarize is overwhelmingly preferred, although burgle is occasionally found).
 butty  (Northern England) a sandwich (esp. 'chip butty' or 'bacon butty').
 by-election  (US: special election)

C
 cack  (slang) faeces (feces); nonsense or rubbish: "what a load of cack" could equally be used to describe someone talking nonsense or as a criticism of something of poor quality. Also spelt "kak" as used in Afrikaans and Dutch. Derived from an ancient Indo-European word, kakkos, cognate with German word Kacke, Welsh word "cach" and the Irish and Scottish Gaelic word "cac" which all mean 'shit'.
 cack-handed  (informal) clumsy * ; left-handed. Derived from cack, meaning "fæces (feces)", with reference to the tradition that only the left hand should be used for cleaning the 'unclean' part of the human body (i.e. below the waist).
 cafetière  device for making coffee (US: French press)
 caff  abbreviation for a cafe; now used mainly for the old-fashioned establishment to distinguish from coffeeshops.
 cagoule  type of lightweight hooded waterproof clothing (US: windbreaker)
 call minder  (rare) telephone message recorder (US and UK also: answering machine; voicemail machine)
 candidature  synonymous with candidacy
 candy floss  spun sugar confection (US: cotton candy); "candyfloss culture" was also used around the late 1950s / early 1960s as a derisory term for the emerging American pop culture, similar to "McCulture" or "Coca-Cola culture" in more recent times

 caravan park  area where caravans are parked (US: Trailer park for near-permanently-installed mobile homes, RV park or campground for areas intended for short term recreational vehicle parking. Trailer parks are typically low-income permanent residencies; RV parks/campgrounds are a holiday (vacation) destination.)
 car boot  storage area of car (US: trunk). Can also mean car boot sale.
 car hire  car rental
 car park  area where cars are parked (US usually parking lot if outdoor, parking garage if indoor).
 carer  a person who cares for another, such as a child, elderly, or disabled person. (US: caregiver)
 carriageway  the part of a road that carries the traffic; see also dual carriageway
 cash machine  automated teller machine.
 cashpoint  automated teller machine. Originally a brand name for Lloyds TSB ATMs, now genericized.
 caster sugar   Finely granulated white or pale golden sugar. (US: superfine sugar)
 cat's eyes  reflectors used to mark lane divisions and edges of roads, also written cats-eye, genericised from the trademark Catseye (US: raised pavement marker; Botts' dots are similar)
 central heating boiler  (US: furnace)
 central reservation  physical barrier separating the two carriageways (on dual carriageways and motorways) (US: median strip)
 chancer  (slang) an opportunist
 char, cha (informal) tea. From Mandarin 茶 (chá).
 char  (informal) see charwoman
 charlady  see charwoman
 Chartered Accountant  one authorised to certify financial statements; the equivalent of an American CPA (Certified Public Accountant)
 charwoman  (dated) a woman employed as a cleaner
 chat up (someone)  talk flirtatiously with. Similar to American "come on to (someone)".
 chav  (slang, often derogatory, used primarily in England) typically a nouveau riche or working class person, often of lowish intelligence, who wears designer label (e.g. Burberry) copies, fake gold bling, and is a trouble-maker. "Chav" is used nationally, though "charv" or "charva" was originally used in the northeast of England, deriving from the Roma word charva, meaning a disreputable youth. The closest US equivalents to the chav stereotype are arguably wiggers, although the cultural differences are existent.
 cheeky *  impertinent; noun form, cheek, impertinence; a child answering back to an adult might be told "don't give me any of your cheek" (also there is the expression "cheeky monkey!" in reaction to a cheeky remark).
 cheerio!  (informal, friendly) exclamation of farewell (similar to 'seeya!' and 'ta-ra!'). No connection to the breakfast cereal Cheerios.
 Chesterfield sofa  a deep buttoned sofa, with arms and back of the same height. It is usually made from leather and the term Chesterfield in British English is only applied to this type of sofa.
 child-minder  (babysitter) a person who looks after babies and young children (usually in the person's own home) while the parents are working. Child-minders are a more professional type of babysitter, and in England are required to be registered with Ofsted, the government-sanctioned education regulation body. They must also have at least a Level 2 qualification in childcare. A babysitter does not require these qualifications. Babysitter is more common in the UK.
 chimney pot  smoke-stack above a house. "Pot" refers to the cylindrical topmost part that is usually earthenware. The part below is the chimney or chimney stack.
 chinagraph pencil  pencil designed to write on china, glass etc. (US: grease pencil, china marker)
 chip shop  (informal) fish-and-chip shop (parts of Scotland, Ireland: chipper), also chippy (see also List of words having different meanings in British and American English)
 chinwag  (slang) chat
 chuffed  (informal) proud, satisfied, pleased. Sometimes intensified as well chuffed; cf. made up
 chunder  vomit
 chunter  (sometimes chunner) to mutter, to grumble, to talk continuously; "What's he chuntering on about?"
 clanger  (informal) a big mistake, blunder, bad joke or faux pas ("to drop a clanger") (US: to lay an egg)
 clapped out  (informal) worn out (said of an object)
 cleg  horse fly
 clingfilm  thin plastic film for wrapping food (US: plastic wrap, Saran wrap)
 cobblers * shoe repairers ; (slang) a weaker version of bollocks, meaning 'nonsense' (often "a load of old cobblers"), from rhyming slang 'cobbler's awls' = balls
 cock-up, cockup *  (mildly vulgar) error, mistake.
 codswallop *, codd's wallop  "You're talking codswallop". Sometimes said to be named after Hiram Codd, the inventor of the Codd bottle, which was commonly used in the late 19th century for fizzy drinks ("Codd's wallop"), though this derivation is thought to be false etymology. (US: You're talking garbage)
 common or garden  of the usual or ordinary type.
 communication cord  near-obsolete term for the emergency brake on a train. It is nowadays an alarm handle connected to a PA system which alerts the driver.
 community payback  court-mandated sentence of community service either in addition to or as a substitute for incarceration
 compère  (French) master of ceremonies, MC
 compulsory purchase  the power of the governmental authority to take private property for public use (similar to US: eminent domain)
 conservatoire  music school (US usually conservatory)
 cooker  kitchen stove (US: stove)
 cool box  box for keeping food and liquids cool (US and UK also: cooler)
 coriander *  when referring to the leaves, often called "cilantro" in the US
 cornflour  Finely ground flour made from corn, used as a thickener in cooking (US: corn starch) 
 Cor Blimey  see Gor Blimey
 coster, costermonger  a seller of fruit and vegetables
 cotton bud  wad of cotton wool fixed to a small stick, used for cleaning (US: cotton swab, Q-Tip)
 council house/flat, also council housing or estate  public housing. In Scotland the term housing scheme, or simply scheme is more commonly used. (US: projects)
 counterfoil * stub of a cheque, ticket etc. (US: stub)
 counterpane  a decorative cloth used to cover a bed when it is not in use (US: bedspread)
 courgette  (French) the plant Cucurbita pepo (US: zucchini, from Italian).
 crack on(-to)  whereas "crack on" may be used in a generalised sense as "[to] get on with [something]" (often, a task), to "crack on to [some person, specifically]" indicates one was, or planned to, engage in flirtation, to varying degrees
 crikey (dated) exclamation of surprise (once a euphemism for Christ's keys or perhaps Christ Kill Me). Popularized in the US by late Australian herpetologist Steve Irwin)
 crimble, crimbo, chrimbo  Christmas, especially with regard to its more secular and commercial aspects. 
 crisps  very thinly sliced fried potatoes, often flavoured, eaten cold as a snack (US: potato chips)
 crotchet  a musical note with a duration of one count in a time signature of 4/4 (common time) (US: quarter note; see Note value)
 cuddly toy  soft toy (sometimes used in the US; also stuffed animal, plush toy). Occurs as the title of the Monkees' song "Cuddly Toy", written by Nilsson.
cuppa  [cup of] tea (never coffee or other beverage)
 current account  personal bank account used for everyday transactions (US: checking account)

D
 daft *  odd, mad, eccentric, daffy, crazy – often with the implication of it being amusingly so. "Don't be daft" and "don't be silly" are approximately synonymous.
 defeating the ends of justice  Scotland only; England and Wales equivalent is perverting the course of justice (similar concept in US: obstruction of justice)
 dekko  (informal) a look, reconnoître "I'll take a dekko at it later." – British military slang derived from the Hindustani dhek/dekho meaning "to see". Also less commonly decco, deccie, deek, deeks.
 dene  wooded valley or seaside dune (mainly S W England)
 doddle  something accomplished easily – "It's a doddle", meaning "it's easy".
 dodgems *  funfair or fairground bumper cars
 dodgy *  unsound, unstable, and unreliable (US: sketchy). 'That bloke over there looks a bit dodgy'
 dogsbody  someone who carries out menial tasks on another's behalf; a drudge (US: grunt)
 the dog's bollocks  (vulgar) something excellent or top quality, the "bee's knees", the "cat's whiskers". Sometimes just "the bollocks." (US: the shit). In polite company this phrase may be toned down to "The mutt's nuts", or the phrase "The bee's knees" may be used as a polite substitute.
 dog’s breakfast/dinner  something poorly executed; a mess
 dole *  (informal) welfare, specifically unemployment benefit. Sometimes used in the US, esp. older generation
 donkey's years  a very long time. (originally "donkey's ears" as rhyming slang).
 door furniture  (US: door hardware)
 doolally  (informal), mentally ill. From the former British Army Deolali transit camp in India
 dosh  (slang) money (US: dough) "how much dosh you got on ya?"
 doss  to be lazy, "I've been dossing all day", also can mean to truant, "dossing off" (similar to bunking off). Additionally it can informally take the form of a noun (i.e. "that lesson was a doss", meaning that lesson was easy, or good (primarily central Scotland). Also "dosser", a lazy person, or a tramp (US bum); "to doss down", to find a place to sleep, to sleep on some substitute for a bed such as a sofa, the floor, or a park bench; "doss-house", temporary accommodation for tramps or homeless people, cheap dilapidated rented accommodation with low standards of cleanliness (US: flophouse)
 double first  an undergraduate degree where the candidate has gained First-Class Honours in two separate subjects, or alternatively in the same subject in subsequent examinations (see British undergraduate degree classification)
 draper  a dealer in drapery (i.e. clothing, textiles, etc.) (US: dry goods [DM])
 draughts  the board game (US: checkers)
 drawing pin *  pin with a large, flat head, used for fixing notices to noticeboards etc. (US: thumbtack)
 dress circle  the seats in the first balcony of a theatre (US: balcony or loge although dress circle is used in a few very large opera houses that have many levels of balconies)
 drink-driving operating a motor vehicle under the influence of alcohol (US: drunk driving; DUI [Driving Under the Influence]; DWI [Driving While Intoxicated/Impaired]; OWI [Operating While Intoxicated])
 driving licence  document authorising the holder to drive a vehicle (US: driver's license, driver license)
 dual carriageway road, usually a major one, with the two directions of travel separated by a traffic-free, and usually slightly raised, central reservation. Each direction of travel (carriageway) comprises two or more 'lanes'. (US: divided highway)
 dustbin  (sometimes used in the US) receptacle for rubbish, very often shortened to 'bin'. (US: trash can; wastebasket)
 dustbin man or dustman rubbish collector (US: garbage man; trash man; sanitation engineer)
 dustcart/dustbin lorry rubbish/refuse collecting vehicle (US: garbage truck; trash truck)

E
 economy class * the cheapest class of passenger airline travel (US: coach or coach class)
 earth, earthed  connected to an electric common return (including but not limited to the physical earth), (US: ground, grounded)
 Elastoplast  an adhesive bandage placed on a minor cut or scrape (UK also: plaster or sticking/sticky plaster [DM]; US: Adhesive bandage, Band-Aid)
 electric fire  domestic electric heater (US: space heater)
 engaged tone tone indicating a telephone line in use, (US: busy signal)
 estate agent *  a person who sells property for others (US: realtor, real estate agent)
 estate car  a station wagon
 exclamation mark * (US: exclamation point)
 ex-directory  (of a telephone number) unlisted; also informally of a person "he's ex-directory", meaning his telephone number is unlisted
 extension lead  Extension cable typically refers to mains power but may refer to other cables like telephones, (US and UK also: extension cord)

F
 faff  to dither, futz, waste time, be ineffectual, "I spent the day faffing about in my room". Also related noun ("That's too much of a faff").

 fag end  cigarette butt; also used as in "the fag end of the day", i.e. the last part of the working day
 fairing  a gift, particularly one given or bought at a fair (obsolete); type of cookie (biscuit) made in Cornwall
 fairy cake  a small sponge cake (US and UK also: cupcake)
 fairy lights  Christmas lights
 fan-assisted oven   an oven that has fans to circulate air around food  (US and UK:  convection oven)

 fiddly *  requiring dexterity to operate ("the buttons on the tiny mobile phone were too fiddly")

 fire brigade fire department
 fish fingers  (US: fish sticks)
 fiver  five pound note (bill)
 fizzy drink *  carbonated soft drink (US: soda, pop, coke, tonic (New England) depending on the region)
 flex  electrical lead (UK); electrical cord (US)
 flight lieutenant  an Air Force officer rank (US: captain)
 flypast   ceremonial flight of aircraft (US:  flyby) 
 flyover  a road crossing over another road (US: overpass)
 footie  (slang) football (US: soccer)
 fortnight * a period of 14 days (and nights) or two weeks
 freephone  a telephone number where the caller is not charged for the call (US: toll-free number)
 French letter  (slang) condom
 funfair  a travelling fair with amusements, stalls, rides etc. (US: carnival or traveling carnival)
 full stop  (US: period (punctuation mark))

G
 gaff  (slang) house, home. Also any other place: cheap music hall, theatre, pub, club, shop, hangout
 gaffer *  (informal) old man; (informal) boss; football manager (US: soccer coach); Also in US: (professional) chief electrician on a theatrical or film set.
 gangway *  a path between the rows of seats in a theatre or elsewhere (US aisle; gangway is a naval command to make a path for an officer)
 gaol  A prison, mostly historical (US and most modern UK usage: jail)
 G clamp  A metal screw clamp (US: C clamp).
 gearbox  system of gears in a vehicle or other machinery (US transmission)
 In UK transmission typically refers to drive shafts.
 gear-lever / gearstick  handle for changing gears in a vehicle or other machinery (US gearshift)
 gen  (informal) information, info (short for "intelligence") (US: intel)
 get off with someone *  (colloquial) to begin a sexual relationship
 Geordie  a person from Newcastle upon Tyne, or used as an adjective to describe the accent or culture of the surrounding Tyne and Wear region of England.
 get on [one's] tits  annoy or irritate.
 gherkin  a pickled cucumber (US: "pickle")
 git *  (derogatory) scumbag, idiot, annoying person (originally meaning illegitimate; from archaic form "get", bastard, which is still used to mean "git" in Northern dialects and is used as such in The Beatles' song "I'm So Tired")
 giro (slang), social security benefit payment (US: welfare), is derived from the largely obsolete Girobank payment system that was once used in Britain for benefit and state pension payments.
 glandular fever  mononucleosis
 gob  1. (n.) mouth, e.g. "Shut your gob" (US: "Shut your trap/flap")
 2. (v.) phlegm or spit containing phlegm (US: loogie)
 gobby  loudmouthed and offensive
 gob-shite  (vulgar, insult) slang term for a person who is being mouthy about something or someone
 gobsmacked  (slang) utterly astonished, open-mouthed
 gods (the) (informal) the highest level of seating in a theatre or auditorium, usually the "Upper Circle", as in "we have a seat up in the gods" (US: nosebleed section)
 go pear-shaped  see pear-shaped
 golden syrup  Syrup of a golden-yellow colour.
 goolies  (slang) the testicles, from goli Hindi for ball.
 gor blimey  exclamation of surprise, also cor blimey (originally from "God blind me")
 Gordon Bennett!  expression of surprise, contempt, outrage, disgust, frustration.
 gormless  stupid or clumsy
 go-slow  a protest in which workers deliberately work slowly (US: slowdown or work to rule)
 green fingers  talent for growing plants (US: green thumb)
 greengrocer *  a retail trader in fruit and vegetables
 gritter  a truck that spreads sand or salt on roads when they are covered with ice (US:  salt truck, salt spreader)
 grotty  disgusting, dirty, poor quality (originally from grotesque, though now rarely used with quite that meaning). In a scene from the 1964 film A Hard Day's Night, George Harrison has to explain the meaning and origin of the word; the impression is given that it was then considered modern slang, known only to trendy youngsters (this is no longer the case). George Harrison would have been familiar with the word as well-established Liverpool slang.
 group captain  an Air Force officer rank (US: colonel)
 guard's van (n.) (also known as a Brake Van or a Driving Van Trailer) the leading or trailing carriage on a train nowadays used for luggage storage (US: Caboose)
 gumption *  initiative, common sense, or courage
 gutties  running shoes, tennis shoes, maybe from "gutta percha" old source of natural rubber
 guv'nor/guv (slang) A contraction of "governor", used to describe a person in a managerial position e.g. "Sorry mate, can't come to the pub, my guv'nor's got me working late tonight". Heard mostly in London.

H
 half-  [as in 'half-eight'] meaning thirty minutes past the hour (Standard English and US: "Half past").
 handbrake *  Parking brake operated by a hand control, usually a lever (US: Emergency brake. In the US, the traditional "hand brake" is more often to be found on a bicycle or motorcycle as opposed to a car as in the UK.); handbrake turn, a stunt where the handbrake is used to lock the rear wheels and the resulting oversteer enables the car to be turned rapidly in a small space (US related: J-turn, bootleg turn, U-turn.)
 ha'penny  (pronounced "HAY-penny" or "HAYP-nee") half a penny; a coin of this denomination belonging to the predecimal coinage which is no longer in circulation. There was also a half penny in the decimal coinage introduced in 1971 which was 1/200 of a pound; these stopped being legal tender in 1985 and were removed from circulation.
 ha'porth  (pronounced "HAY-puth") halfpennyworth.
 hash sign  the symbol "#" (US: number sign, pound sign [DM], hash tag)
 headmaster, headmistress, headteacher, head * the person in charge of a school (US: principal [DM]; headmaster and the like are usually used for private schools)

 Heath Robinson  (of a machine or contraption) absurdly complex (see Rube Goldberg machine).
 high street  primary business and shopping street (US: main street)
 hire purchase a credit system by which purchased articles are paid for in installments (US: installment plan or layaway if the item is kept at the store until the final payment is made)
 hoarding  a panel used to display outdoor advertisements, such as on the sides of buildings, or alongside highways (US billboard)
 hob  the hot surface on a stove (US: burner)
 hold-all  a bag (US: duffel bag)

 holidaymaker  person on holiday [DM] (US: vacationer)
 hols  (informal) short for holidays [DM]
 hoover  vacuum [cleaner], to vacuum (archaic in the US); a genericised trademark, from The Hoover Company, the first main manufacturer of vacuum cleaners
 hot up  to become more exciting (US: heating up). 
 hundreds-and-thousands coloured sugar sprinkles used for dessert decoration (US: sprinkles, non-pareils, jimmies)

I
 ice lolly  frozen fruit juice on a stick; (US: ice pop, Popsicle),
 icing sugar  (US: powdered sugar)
 identity parade  police lineup
 industrial action  (see article; US: job action)
 inverted commas  quotation marks (see also American and British English differences – Punctuation)
 invigilator  person who monitors an examination (US: proctor [DM])
 ironmongery  ironware, hardware; hardware store

J
 jacket potato  baked potato
 jam sandwich  (slang) police car. So called as, in the past, most UK police vehicles were white with a horizontal yellow-edged red fluorescent stripe along the entire length of their sides, giving a certain resemblance to a white bread sandwich with a coloured jam filling. The majority of marked vehicle operated by the Metropolitan Police Service retain this livery, albeit the cars are now (mostly) silver. Some older vehicles are still in white, while the Diplomatic Protection Group (DPG) use red vehicles. (US: black-and-white. In many cities of the US, police cars are painted black at the hood and trunk and white on the doors and roof.)
 jammy (git, cow)  (slang) lucky (person, woman)
 JCB  generic name for a mechanical excavator or backhoe loader, based on the eponymously named company which manufactures such devices.

 jemmy  To break into a lock, from the tool that is used in such an occasion as burglary (US: jimmy)
 jerry  (slang) pejorative term for a German or Germans
 jerrybuilt or jerry-built  An improvised or unsafe building or piece of infrastructure (e.g. an electrical installation), probably in contravention of safety legislation; (US: jerry-rigged, jury-rigged).
 jiggery-pokery  Trickery or dishonest behaviour.
 jimmy  (Rhyming slang) urinate, as in jimmy riddle – piddle
 jobsworth  (slang) Originally a minor clerical/government worker who refuses to be flexible in the application of rules to help clients or customers (as in "it will cost me more than my job's worth to bend the rules"). Also used more broadly to apply to anyone who uses their job description in a deliberately obstructive way.
 johnny  (slang) a condom (US: rubber [DM], Jimmy-hat)
 John Thomas  Better known as slang for penis or "dick" (US: cock, dick, or johnson) From the novel Lady Chatterley's Lover
 Joey  Term of abuse used of someone perceived to be foolish, stupid, incompetent, clumsy, uncoordinated, ridiculous, idiotic. Originated with the appearances of cerebral palsy sufferer Joey Deacon on children's TV programme Blue Peter; still a popular insult among adults who saw the programmes as children.
 jumble sale  (see article; US: rummage sale)
 jumper  a pullover *, sweater
 jump leads  booster cables used to jump-start a car (US: jumper cables)

K
 Karno's Army a chaotic, ineffective team (usually: Fred Karno's Army) (related US: Keystone Kops, Gang That Couldn't Shoot Straight)
 kecks  (informal, also spelt keks) trousers or underpants
 kerfuffle *  a disorderly outburst, disturbance or tumult; from Scots carfuffle
 kazi  (slang) lavatory (numerous alternative spellings are seen, such as khazi, karzy, karsey, carzey etc.)
 kip  (slang) sleep.
 kirby grip  hair grip. (US: bobby pin)
 kitchen roll  paper towels
 knackered  (slang) exhausted, broken; the term may derive from either of two meanings of the noun knacker (see knacker's yard and knackers below), thus to slaughter or castrate 
 knacker's yard  premises where superannuated livestock are sent for rendering, etc. by a knacker. Sometimes refers to the same for vehicles, a scrapyard (US: junkyard)
 knackers  (slang) testicles
 knickers  girls' and women's underpants (US: panties): hence, "Don't get your knickers in a twist" (US: "don't get your panties in a wad", "keep calm", "hold your horses", "chill out")

L
 ladybird  red and black flying insect (US: ladybug)
 lag (usually "old lag")  an inmate in a prison
 landslip  A collapse of a mass of earth or rock from a mountain or cliff (US:  landslide)
 launderette  self-service laundry (US: laundromat, from an expired Westinghouse trademark)
 lav  (informal) lavatory, toilet; also, lavvy (in the US, airplane restrooms are typically called lavatories)
 lead (electrical, as on an appliance or musical instrument, microphone etc.)  electrical cord (US)
 learnt  past tense of "learn" (US: learned); occasionally used in African American Vernacular English
 legacy accounts  funds left in a budget (US: funds remaining)
 legless  extremely drunk
 lessons  classes (class used more commonly in US English)
 let-out  (n.) a means of evading or avoiding something
 letter box  1. a slot in a wall or door through which incoming post [DM] is delivered (US: mail slot, mailbox)
 2. (less common) a box in the street for receiving outgoing letters and other mail (more usually called a postbox or pillar box) (US: mailbox)
 See also Letterbox (US & UK): a film display format taking its name from the shape of a letter-box slot
 life assurance also described as life insurance regardless of coverage (US: life insurance)
 liquidiser  blender
 lock-in *  illegal gathering in a pub at night to drink after the pub is supposed to have stopped serving alcohol, where the landlord "locks in" his guests to avoid being caught by police. Unless the landlord charges for the drinks at the time, the people in the pub are considered his personal guests; if money is exchanged beforehand or afterwards then it is considered a gift from the guest to the landlord for the hospitality. Since the introduction of the smoking ban in England and Wales in 2007, a "lock in" can now mean a landlord locking the pub doors and allowing smoking inside the premises. Also called a stay-back or stoppy-back in Northern England. (US: may refer to a large and highly chaperoned "sleep over" at a church, school, etc.)
 lodger *  tenant renting a room rather than an entire property; typically lives with the renter and his/her family
 lollipop man / woman / lady  a school crossing guard who uses a circular stop sign
 lolly *  1. lollipop /ice lolly (US: popsicle); (q.v.)
 2. (slang) money
 loo  toilet (usually the room, not just the plumbing device) (US: bathroom in a home, restroom in a public place; occasionally washroom in the north, borrowed from Canadian usage)
 lorry  a large goods-carrying motor vehicle (US and UK also: truck)
 loudhailer  megaphone (US: bullhorn)
 lower ground  In houses, a floor below ground level but not fully underground, typically under a raised ground floor which has steps up from ground level to the main entrance. In offices and shops, a basement.
 lurgy  (hard 'g', originally spelled "lurgi") 1. An imaginary illness allegedly passed on by touch—used as an excuse to avoid someone. (c.f. US: cooties) From an episode of the Goon Show. 2. (slang) A fictitious, yet highly infectious disease; often used in the phrase "the dreaded lurgy", sometimes as a reference to flu-like symptoms. Can also be used when informing someone one is unwell but one either does not know or does not want to say what the illness is.

M
 mains power, the mains  230 V (Typically denoted on domestic electricals as the older 240 V standard) AC electric current, provided by the electricity grid to homes and businesses; also attrib. ("mains cable") (US: 120 volts AC, variously called: line power, grid power, AC power, household electricity, etc.)
 manky  (slang) feeling ill, rough, out of sorts; filthy, dirty, rotten. (of uncertain origin, poss. from French "manqué" – missed, wasted or faulty)
 mardy  (derogatory, mainly Northern and Central England) describes someone who is in a bad mood, or more generally a crybaby or whiner or "grumpy, difficult, unpredictable". Used, for example, by children in the rhyme "Mardy, mardy mustard...", and in the title of the Arctic Monkeys song "Mardy Bum". The verb to throw a mardy means to display an outburst of anger.
 maths  mathematics (US: math)
 MD (managing director)  equivalent of US CEO (Chief Executive Officer), also used in the UK
 Mexican wave  simply called The Wave in the US
 mentioned in dispatches  a commendation through being identified positively in a military report
 milliard (obsolete) one thousand million, or 1,000,000,000 (US: billion or 1,000,000,000) Has for a long time been superseded by the short scale usage of billion (1,000,000,000) and was never as commonly used in the UK as it still is in mainland Europe (where the long scale is still used); when the long scale was used in Britain, "a thousand million" was more commonplace.
 minge  (vulgar) (rhymes with singe) female genitals or pubic hair
 minger (from the Scots ming "to smell strongly and unpleasantly"; rhymes with "singer") someone who is unattractive (i.e. minging, see below).
 minging (from the Scots ming "to smell strongly and unpleasantly"; rhymes with "singing") disgusting, dirty; unattractive.
 minim  a musical note with the duration of two counts in a time signature of 4/4 (US: half note; see Note value)
 mobile phone  (US:  cell phone)
 moggie, moggy  (informal) non-pedigree cat; alley cat; any cat regardless of pedigree; Morris Minor car; Morgan car
 Mole grips  trade name for (US: Vise-Grips).
 mong  (offensive) stupid person or one with learning difficulties; from Mongol in its sense as an obsolete term for someone with Down's syndrome
 monged (out)  (slang) being incapable of constructive activity due to drug use, alcohol consumption or extreme tiredness
 MOT, MOT test  (pronounced emm'oh'tee) mandatory annual safety and roadworthiness test for motor vehicles over 3 years old (from "Ministry of Transport", now renamed "Department for Transport")
 motorway  A controlled-access highway, the largest class of road on the British road network, designed for fast, high volume traffic. Abbreviated to M, as in M25 or M1. (US: equivalent to freeway)
 mouthing off  shouting, ranting or swearing a lot about something or someone. e.g.: "that guy was just mouthing off about something" (US [DM]: backtalk; often shortened to mouth ["I don't need your mouth".])
 move house, move flat, etc.  to move out of one's house or other residence into a new residence (US: move, move out)
 multi-storey  used as a noun, to refer to a multi-level parking structure.
 munter  an ugly woman (rarely, man); similar to minger
 muppet  an incompetent or foolish person

N
 naff (slang) lame, tacky, cheap, low quality (origin uncertain – numerous suggestions include backslang for fan, an old term for a vagina), also gay slang for a straight man 
 naff all  nothing, fuck all
 naff off  (dated slang) shove it, get lost, go away – a much less offensive alternative to "fuck off" (originally obscure Polari slang, made popular by prison sitcom Porridge and famously used by Princess Anne)
 nail varnish  a varnish applied to nails to enhance strength and glossiness. (US: nail polish)
 nancy boy  an effeminate man, a homosexual (dated)
 nark *  1. (v.) (informal) irritate; also narked, the adjective.
 2. (n.) (slang) police informer (US: narc, derived from narcotics agent, but often used in a general sense)
 nappy  absorbent undergarment for babies (US: diaper)

 National Insurance compulsory payments made to the Government from earnings to pay for welfare benefits, the National Health Service (see below) and the state pension fund.
 never-never  (slang) hire purchase (see above). Often used in the media as a derogatory term to describe credit or debt.
 newsagent  strictly a shop owner or shop that sells newspapers, usu. refers to a small shop, e.g. corner shop, convenience store, newsstand, or similar (US: newsdealer)
 newsreader  someone who reads the news on TV or radio. See news presenter for a description of the different roles of a newscaster, a British newsreader and an American news anchor.
 nice one *  (slang) a way of thanking someone, or congratulating them. 
 nick  1. (v.) to steal
 2. (n.) a police station or prison
 nicked  arrested ("you're nicked") – related to "the nick", above (US: up the river, busted)
 nicker  (colloquial) 1 pound, maintains singular form when used in a plural context ("it cost me 2 nicker"), rarely used in the singular
 niff  an unpleasant smell
 Nissen hut  hemicylindrical building of corrugated metal. Named for the designer. (US: Quonset hut, named for the place of US manufacture)
 NHS  the National Health Service, the state run healthcare system within the United Kingdom
 nob  1. head
 2. a person of wealth or social standing
 nobble  (v.) to sabotage, attempt to hinder in some way. E.g. "Danny nobbled my chances at the pub quiz by getting Gary to defect to his team."
 nonce  a slang term for a sex offender, especially one convicted of sexual offences against children. Said to originate from the term "Not on normal courtyard exercise", although this is a likely backronym.  
 nosy (or nosey) parker *  a busybody (similar to US: butt-in, buttinski, nosy)
 nous  Good sense; shrewdness: "Hillela had the nous to take up with the General when he was on the up-and-up again" (Nadine Gordimer). Rhymes with "mouse".
nought the number zero, chiefly British spelling of naught
noughts and crossesgame played by marking Xs and Os in a 3x3 grid (US: tic-tac-toe)
nowt  nothing; not anything. "I've got nowt to do later." Northern English. (see also 'owt' – anything; as in the phrase "you can't get owt for nowt" or "you can't get anything for nothing")
 number plate  vehicle registration plate (sometimes used in the US; also license plate or license tag)
 numpty  (originally Scottish, now more widespread) a stupid person
 nutter (informal) a crazy or insane person, often violent; also used as a more light-hearted term of reproach ("Oi nutter!") (occasionally used in the US) (US and UK also: nut, nutcase)

O
 OAP  Old Age Pensioner (US senior citizen)
 off-licence / offie a store for alcoholic beverages which must be imbibed elsewhere (US liquor store)
 off-the-peg  of clothes etc., ready-made rather than made to order (US: off-the-rack)
 off you/we go *  a command to begin something or to start moving (US: "let's go")
 offal *  the entrails and internal organs of a butchered animal.
 oi  coarse exclamation to gain attention, roughly equivalent to "hey" ("Oi, you!" = "Hey you!")
 oik, oick  an obnoxious or unpleasant person; can also mean someone who is working class, and often considered offensive in this context
 the Old Bill  (slang) The police – specifically the Metropolitan Police in London, but use of the term has spread elsewhere in England
 one-off *  something that happens only once; limited to one occasion (as an adjective, a shared synonym is one-shot; as a noun ["She is a one-off"; US: one of a kind])
 on the back foot  outclassed; outmanoeuvred by a competitor or opponent 
 on the piss  (vulgar) drinking heavily; going out for the purpose of drinking heavily; at a slight angle, said of an object that should be vertical
 on the trot  (idiom, informal) adverbial referring to actions done directly after each other in sequence or, alternately, with no pause  (alternately synonymous with in a row or continuously in U.S.); also used adjectivally to mean always busy 
 orientate *  less common alternative to orient, deprecated by some as an unnecessary back-formation from orientation
 other ranks  members of the military who are not commissioned officers. (US: incorporates both enlisted ranks and non-coms in the US usage of these terms)
 oughtn't  A contraction of "ought not" (US "shouldn't, ought not")
 overdraft *  money spent on a bank account that results in a debit (negative) balance; the amount of the debit balance, an "overdraft facility", is permission from a bank to draw to a certain debit balance. In US English, overdraft and overdraft limit are used, respectively.
 overleaf *  on the other side of the page (US: reverse)
 owt  anything. Northern English. "Why aren't you saying owt?" See also 'nowt' – as in the phrase "can't get owt for nowt" meaning "can't get anything for nothing."
 oy See "oi".

P
 P45  a form issued upon severance of employment stating an employee's tax code.  (US: pink slip)  The idiom "to get your P45" is often used in Britain as a metonym for being fired or RIF'd.  The alternate phrases "to get your cards", or "get your books" are often used – dependent on region.
 package holiday  a holiday in which transport, accommodation, itinerary etc. are organised by a travel company (US and UK less frequently: package tour). Cf holiday [DM]
 Page Three  a feature found in some tabloid newspapers consisting of a large photograph of a topless female glamour model
 Paki  a Pakistani person; often loosely applied to anyone from South Asia, or of perceived South Asian origin. Now considered extremely offensive.
 Paki shop  a newsagent or general corner shop run by a person of Pakistani or other South Asian origin. No longer considered an acceptable term; edited out of repeat showings of an episode of Only Fools and Horses. Not to be confused with "packie", used in some areas of the US such as New England, short for "package store", meaning "liquor store". As with some other terms (cf. fanny pack), this is a case where innocent US use of a term may be unintentionally offensive in the UK.
 panda car  (informal) police car. Small police car used for transport, as opposed to a patrol or area car (analogous to US: black-and-white) Derives from a period in the 1970s when UK police cars resembled those of their US counterparts, only with blue replacing black.
 paper round  (the job of making) a regular series of newspaper deliveries (US: paper route)
 paraffin  kerosene
 paracetamol  a common and widely available drug for the treatment of headaches, fever and other minor aches and pains (US: acetaminophen, Tylenol)
 parkie  (informal) park-keeper
 parky  (informal) cold, usually used in reference to the weather
 pasty, Cornish pasty  hard pastry case filled with meat and vegetables served as a main course, particularly in Cornwall and in the north of England
 pear-shaped  usually in the phrase "to go pear-shaped", meaning to go drastically or dramatically wrong. cf tits-up
 peckish *  moderately hungry (usage dated in US)
 peeler  in Northern Ireland, colloquial word for "policeman". Similar to "bobby", q.v.
 pelican crossing  pedestrian crossing with traffic lights operated by pedestrians (formed from Pedestrian Light-Controlled)
 people mover or people carrier  a minivan or other passenger van
 pernickety  fastidious, precise or over-precise (US: persnickety)
 Perspex *  Trade name for Poly(methyl methacrylate) (PMMA), a transparent thermoplastic sometimes called "acrylic glass" (US: Plexiglass, trade name of a form produced earlier in the U.S.)
 perverting the course of justice  England and Wales only (similar concept in US: obstruction of justice)

 petrol  refined mixture of hydrocarbons, used esp. to fuel motor vehicles (short for petroleum spirit, or from French essence de pétrole) (US: gasoline, gas). Also variously known as motor spirit (old-fashioned), motor gasoline, mogas, aviation gasoline and avgas (the last two being a slightly heavier type designed for light aircraft)
 petrol-head, petrolhead  someone with a strong interest in cars (especially high performance cars) and motor racing (US: gearhead or motorhead).
 phone box  payphone, public phone. See also "telephone kiosk" (infra) (US: phone booth)
 photofit  a portrait created from photograph samples of facial features, relying on the accounts of witnesses of a criminal suspect, for the purpose of appealing to the public in the attempt to identify the suspect (trademark)  (no direct US equivalent but similar identikit and generic facial composite used in US and UK)
 pikey  a pejorative slang term, used originally to refer to Irish Travellers. Now refers to anyone whose lifestyle is characterised by itinerancy, theft, illicit land occupancy with destruction of amenities, and disregard for authority, without reference to ethnic or national origin.
 pillar box  box in the street for receiving outgoing mail, in Britain traditionally in the form of a free-standing red pillar; also called postbox or, less commonly, letter box (US: mailbox)
 See also Pillarbox: the effect created when an image is not wide enough for the full width of the display screen (i.e. the vertical equivalent of the horizontal letterbox).
 pillar-box red  the traditional bright red colour of a British pillar box (US: fire engine red or candy apple red)
 pillock  (slang, derogatory) foolish person, used esp. in northern England but also common elsewhere. Derived from the Northern English term pillicock, a dialect term for penis, although the connection is rarely made in general use.
 pinch *  to steal.
 pisshead  (vulgar) someone who regularly gets heavily drunk (cf. BrE meaning of pissed).
 pissing it down [with rain]  (slang, mildly vulgar) raining hard (sometimes "pissing down" is used in the US, as in "It's pissing down out there.") Also "pissing it down the drain" or "pissing it away" * meaning to waste something.
 pitch  playing field
 plain flour   Flour that does not contain a raising agent. (US:  All-purpose flour) 
 plait *  braid, as in hair
 plaster  Band-Aid
 plasterboard   Drywall
 pleb * (derogatory) person of lower class, from plebeian; similar to townie. Also commonly used to mean idiot.
 plectrum  (US and UK: guitar pick)
 plimsoll  a type of shoe with a canvas upper and rubber sole, formerly the typical gym shoe used in schools. Now superseded by "trainer". (US: sneaker or Tennis shoe)
 plod  policeman (mildly derogatory) – from PC Plod in Enid Blyton's Noddy books.
 plonk  a disparaging term for cheap wine, especially cheap red wine, is now widely known in the UK and also to a lesser extent in the USA. Derives from French vin blanc and came into English use on the western front in World War I.
 plonker * (very mildly derogatory) fool. Used esp. in the south-east of England, although not unknown elsewhere (probably popularised in the rest of the UK by Only Fools and Horses). Derived from a slang term for penis, and sometimes used in this fashion, e.g. "Are you pulling my plonker?" (to express disbelief) (US var: "Are you yanking my chain?")
 points  (n.) mechanical crossover on a railway, (US: switch), hence the term "points failure" is a very common cause of delays on railways, such as the London Underground.
 polling day  (n.) synonym of election day
 ponce  (n.) (slang) someone with overly affected airs and graces; an effeminate posturing man; a pimp. Originates from Maltese slang. (related US: poncey)
(v.) (slang) to act like a pimp; to cadge, to borrow with little or no intention of returning, often openly so ("Can I ponce a ciggie off you, mate?")
(slang) to act like a fop, to wander about aimlessly without achieving anything
 ponce off  (v.) (slang) to mooch, to hit up, to leave in a pompous manner
 pong (n.) (slang) a strong unpleasant smell; (v.) to give off a strong unpleasant smell; (adj.) pongy
 poof, poofter  (derogatory) a male homosexual (US equivalent: fag, faggot)
 pouffe, poof, poove  A small drum-shaped soft furnishing used as a foot rest (related US: hassock, Ottoman)
 porky, porkies slang for a lie or lying, from rhyming slang "pork pies" = "lies"
 postage and packing, P&P  charge for said services (US: shipping and handling, S&H; the word postage is, however, used in both dialects)
 postal order  a money order designed to be sent through the post, issued by the UK Post Office (US: money order, or postal money order if the context is ambiguous)
 postbox, post box  box in the street for receiving outgoing mail (US: mailbox; drop box); see also letter box, pillar box
 postcode  alphanumeric code used to identify an address, part of a UK-wide scheme. (US equivalent: ZIP Code)
 poste restante  service whereby mail is retained at a post office for collection by the recipient (from French) (US: general delivery)
 postie  (informal) postman (of either gender)
 pound shop  (US: dollar store)
 power point  electrical outlet
 poxy  (slang) something that is unsatisfactory or in generally bad condition.
 prang  (slang) to crash a motor vehicle with generally minor damage (US: fender bender)
 pram, perambulator  wheeled conveyance for babies (US: baby-carriage)
 prat *  (slang) an incompetent or ineffectual person, a fool, an idiot
 press-up  a conditioning exercise in which one lies prone and then pushes oneself up by the arms (outside Britain: push-up)
 pritt-stick glue stick, from the trademark of a common brand.
 proper *  Real or very much something. "He's a proper hero" (US: "He's a real hero")
 provisional licence, provisional driving licence  a licence for a learner driver, who has not yet passed a driving test (US: learner's permit)
 prozzie, (occasionally prozzer) a prostitute (US: hooker)
 pub  short for public house (US: bar)
 publican  the landlord of a public house.
 pud  (informal) short for "pudding", which may mean dessert or occasionally a savoury item such as Yorkshire pudding or black pudding; a fool (informal term usually used good-naturedly between family members). pulling his pud, means male masturbation by a "pudknocker".
 pukka  legitimate, the real thing, of good quality (usually Southeastern England term, recently more widely popularised by Jamie Oliver, but dating back to the 19th century). From Hindi-Urdu .
 punch-up  a fistfight
 puncture  (n.) A flat tire on a vehicle, as in "I had a puncture on my bicycle".
 punnet  small basket for fruit, usually strawberries
 punter  customer or user of services. Often refers to a naive speculator, bettor, or gambler, or a customer of a prostitute or confidence trickster.
 pushbike  (informal) bicycle (predates the modern safety bicycle q.v. velocipede) (often used in contrast to a motor bike)
 pushchair  forward-facing baby carriage (US: stroller)

Q
 quango  quasi-autonomous non-governmental organisation. A semi-public (supposedly non-governmental) advisory or administrative body funded by the taxpayer, often having most of its members appointed by the government, and carrying out government policy.
 quaver  a musical note with the duration of one half-count in a time signature of 4/4 (US: eighth note). Also compound nouns semiquaver (US: sixteenth note), demisemiquaver (US: thirty-second note), hemidemisemiquaver (US: sixty-fourth note); see note value. Also a variety of snack food potato crisp/chip.
 queue  A sequence or line of people (maybe in vehicles or whatever) awaiting their turn for a service or activity (similar to US line).
 quid  (informal) the pound sterling monetary unit; remains quid in plural form ("Can I borrow ten quid?") (similar to US buck, meaning dollar)
(US: money ahead)
 quieten  used in the phrase "quieten down" (US: quiet down)

R
 randy  (informal) having sexual desire, (now more common in the US because of the Austin Powers franchise) (US: horny)
 ranker  an enlisted soldier or airman or (more rarely) a commissioned officer who has been promoted from enlisted status ("the ranks" *)
 rashers * cuts of bacon
 rat-arsed  (slang) extremely drunk (similar to US shit-faced)
 recce  (informal) reconnoître, reconnaissance (pronounced ) (US: recon)
 recorded delivery  certified mail (No longer in official use: replaced by "signed for on delivery".)
 Red top  sensational tabloid newspaper
 reel of cotton  in the US is spool of thread 
 Register Office, Registry Office  government office where births, marriages, civil partnerships, and deaths are recorded; usually refers to local Register Office (in each town or locality). General Register Office is the relevant government department. In England and Wales until 2001, almost all civil (non-church) marriages took place in the local Register Office; different laws apply in Scotland and Northern Ireland. "Register Office" is the correct legal term, but "registry office" is in common informal use. (US: Office of Vital Statistics)
Release on Licence  a term for parole in England and Wales
 retail park  an out-of-town shopping complex populated mainly by large format stores, one of which is typically a supermarket. (US: strip mall, or the specialised business jargon power center, are roughly equivalent)
 return  A ticket that is valid for travel to a destination and back. A round-trip ticket.
 roadworks  upgrade or repairs of roads (US: construction; roadwork [singular])
 rocket (eruca sativa) leafy, green vegetable used in salads and sandwiches, (US: arugula)
 rock  (usually "a stick of rock") hard candy in cylindrical form, often sold at holiday locations and made so that the location's name appears on the end even when broken. (US: no exact equivalent, but similar to a candy cane)
 rodgering or rogering (vulgar) to engage in a sexual act, or suggest it. e.g.: "I'd give her a good rodgering!"
 ropey  (informal) chancy; of poor quality; uncertain (see dodgy). Can also mean unwell when used in the form to feel ropey
 row *  a heated noisy argument (rhymes with cow)
 reverse charge call  a telephone call for which the recipient pays (US and UK also: collect call); also v. to reverse charge, to reverse the charges*, etc. to make such a call (dated in US, used in the 1934 American film It Happened One Night – US usually: to call collect)
 rota  a roll call or roster of names, or round or rotation of duties
 (the) rozzers  (rare slang) Police ("Quick, the rozzers! Scarper!") – possibly from Robert Peel, who also gave his name to two other slang terms for the police: peelers (archaic) and bobbies (becoming old-fashioned).
 rubbish *  worthless, unwanted material that is rejected or thrown out; debris; litter; metaphorically: bad human output, such as a weak argument or a poorly written novel (US: trash, garbage)
 rucksack * a backpack.
 rug muncher * lesbian.
 rumpy pumpy  sexual intercourse, used jokingly. (Popularised in England by its usage in The Black Adder and subsequent series; the suggestion of actor Alex Norton of a Scots term.)

S
 sandwich cake or sandwich (US: layer cake)
 sarky  (informal) sarcastic (abbrev.) "Why are you being so sarky?" (US: snarky)
 sarnie, sarny, sannie  (informal) sandwich (abbrev.)
 sat nav  GPS, from satellite navigation 
 scouser  a person from Liverpool, or the adjective scouse to describe anything or anyone from either Liverpool or Merseyside. 
 scrubber  a lower class, (usually young) woman of low morals
 scrumpy  cloudy cider, often high in alcoholic content.  Stereotypically associated with South West England.
 scrumping  action of stealing apples from an orchard; also v. to scrump
 self-raising flour  self-rising flour
 secateurs  gardening tool for pruning plants (US:garden shears, pruners or clippers)
 secondment  (/sɪˈkɒndmənt/) the temporary assignment of a person from his or her regular place of work to work elsewhere. From v. second (/sɪˈkɒnd/)
 selling-out shop  A North English form of off-licence (US liquor store)
 Sellotape  transparent adhesive tape (trademark) (US Scotch tape)
 semibreve  a musical note with the duration of four counts in a time signature of 4/4 (US: whole note; see Note value)
 send to Coventry ostracize, shun (US: send to Siberia, vote off the island)
 service station A motorway service area, a location adjacent to motorways and major roads supplying fuel, food, and sometimes accommodation (US: rest stop)
 serviette  (from French) table napkin [DM]. Regarded as a non-U word, but widely used by non-U people. Frequently encountered in Canada.
 shafted  broken beyond repair – can also be used to describe extreme exhaustion. Also cheated, ripped off: he got shafted
 shag  To have sexual intercourse
 shambolic  chaotic, disorganized
 shandy *  a drink consisting of lager or beer mixed with a soft drink, originally ginger beer but now more usually lemonade, in near-equal parts.
 shanks's pony  on foot, walking – as in "The car's broken down, so it's shanks's pony I'm afraid".
 shan't  A contraction of shall not, considered archaic in American English (US and UK also: "won't").  Rarely used in Scotland.
 shirtlifter  homosexual.
 shite  (vulgar) variant of shit
 shopping trolley  A cart supplied by a business for use by customers for transport of merchandise to the checkout counter during shopping. (US: shopping cart)
 sixes and sevens  crazy, muddled (usually in the phrase "at sixes and sevens"). From the London livery company order of precedence, in which position 6 is claimed by both the Worshipful Company of Merchant Taylors and the Worshipful Company of Skinners.
 sket  (slang) a promiscuous woman; US: slut, skank
 skew-whiff  skewed, uneven, not straight
 skint  (informal) out of money (US: broke)
 skip  industrial rubbish bin (US: dumpster)
 skirting board  a wooden board covering the lowest part of an interior wall (US: baseboard)
 skive [off]  (informal) to sneak off, avoid work; to play truant (US: play hookey)
 slag *  (slang) a promiscuous woman; US: slut, skank
 slag off *  to badmouth; speak badly of someone, usually behind their back
 slaphead  (informal) bald man
 slapper  a promiscuous woman
 sleeping partner  a partner in business, often an investor, who is not visibly involved in running the enterprise (US: silent partner)
 sleeping policeman  mound built into a road to slow down vehicles (UK also: hump [DM]; US & UK also: speed bump)
 slip road  (US: entrance ramp/onramp or exit ramp/offramp)
 slippy  (slang) smooth, wet, with no friction or traction to grip something (US: slippery)
 slowcoach  (slang) a slow person (US: slowpoke)
 smalls  underclothing, underwear, particularly underpants
 smart dress formal attire
 snigger *  silly or unkind laughter at someone or something (usually snicker in U.S.) 
 smeghead  (slang) idiot; a general term of abuse, from Red Dwarf.
 snog  (slang) a 'French kiss' or to kiss with tongues (US [DM]: deep kiss, not necessarily with tongues)
 soap dodger  one who is thought to lack personal hygiene
 sod off  (vulgar, moderately offensive) go away; get lost
 solicitor  lawyer, legal representative (US: attorney)
 spacker, spacky, spazmo  (vulgar, offensive to many) idiot, general term of abuse: from "Spastic", referring in England almost exclusively (when not used as an insult) to a person suffering from cerebral palsy. (variant forms spaz/spastic, are used in American English) See also Joey.
 spanner  (US: wrench)
 (slang) an idiot, a contemptible person (US: a less pejorative synonym for tool.) "He's as stupid as a bag of spanners." (US var.: "He's dumber than a bag of hammers".)
 spawny  lucky
 spend a penny  (informal, old-fashioned) urinate
 spiffing  (informal) very good (old-fashioned, or consciously used as old-fashioned, associated stereotypically with upper-class people) (US: spiffy)
 spiv  a dealer in black market goods (during World War II). The term wide boy is also often used in the same sense
 spliff *  (slang) a hand-rolled cigarette containing a mixture of marijuana and tobacco, also joint. (Also used in US; joint, j, or blunt more widely used.)
 spotted dick  an English steamed suet pudding containing dried fruit (usually currants), commonly served with custard.
 squaddie  (informal) a non-commissioned soldier (US: grunt)
 square go  unarmed brawl
 squadron leader  an Air Force officer rank (US: major)
 squidgy  (informal) soft and soggy (US: squishy)
 squiffy  (informal) intoxicated (popularly but probably erroneously said to be from British Prime Minister H. H. Asquith, a noted imbiber). The word can also be synonymous with skew-whiff.
 squiz  (rare) look, most often used in the form to have a squiz at...
 stamp  (slang) National Insurance payments (e.g.: I have not paid enough stamps to get my full state pension)
 star jump  a form of exercise (US: jumping jack)
 sticky-backed plastic  large sheet of thin, soft, coloured plastic that is sticky on one side; generic term popularised by craft segments on the children's TV show Blue Peter (US similar: contact paper)
 sticky wicket  (usually "batting on a sticky wicket") facing a difficult situation. From cricket: a sticky wicket is one that has a damp surface on top of a dry base, typically after rain. It causes the ball to bounce unpredictably and possibly dangerously for the batsman
 stockist  a seller (as a retailer) that stocks merchandise of a particular type, usually a specified brand or model (US: dealer)
 stone the crows  exclamation of surprise (US holy cow, holy mother of pearl)
 straight away  immediately (sometimes used in the US; also right away)
 strong flour   flour made from wheat varieties which are high in gluten.  Used for making bread.  (US:  bread flour)
 stroke  to move one's hand slowly and gently over something e.g. stroke a dog. (US: pet)
 strop  (informal) bad mood or temper
 sun cream  sunscreen
 suck it and see  to undertake a course of action without knowing its full consequences (US: "take your chances")
 supply teacher  a school employee who teaches students when their usual instructor is absent. (US: substitute teacher)
 suss [out] *  (informal) to figure out (from suspicion)
 suspender belt a ladies' undergarment to hold up stockings (US: garter belt)
 swot  1. v. to study for an exam (US cram)
 2. n. (derogatory) aloof and unpopular schoolchild or student who studies to excess (US: nerd)
 sweets  the same term for candy in US
 sweet FA  (slang) nothing (from "Sweet Fanny Adams", alternative: "Sweet Fuck All"), "I know sweet FA about cars!" (US: jack shit)
 swimming costume swimsuit or bathing suit; also  for short.

T
 ta  (informal) "thank you"
 Taff, Taffy  moderately offensive nickname for a Welshman
 tailback  A long line of stationary or slow-moving traffic extending back from a busy junction or similar obstruction on the road. (US:  back up)
 takeaway  food outlet where one can order food to go (or be delivered) (not usually applied to fast food chains). Usage: "we had a takeaway for dinner", "we went to the local takeaway". [DM]; (US: takeout)
 take the piss (vulgar)  / take the mickey (slang) to make fun of somebody or something; to act in a non-serious manner about something important. Can also mean to transgress beyond what are perceived as acceptable bounds, or to treat with perceived contempt
 takings *  receipts of money at a shop etc.
 Tannoy  loudspeaker (a proprietary brand name), public address system
 tapping up  in professional team sport, attempting to persuade a player contracted to one team to transfer to another team without the knowledge or permission of the player's current team (US: "tampering")
 ta-ra!  (informal, friendly) exclamation of farewell (similar to 'seeya!' and 'cheerio!' (above)). Originally from Merseyside (see Scouser, above)
 telephone kiosk  payphone, public phone. See also "phone box" (supra) (US: phone booth)
 tea towel  a cloth which is used to dry dishes, cutlery, etc., after they have been washed. (US: dish towel)
 telerecording  a recording of a live television broadcast made directly from a cathode ray tube onto motion picture film. The equivalent US term is kinescope.
 telly  (informal) television
 tenner  ten pound note
 Territorial a member of the Territorial Army (in 2014 renamed the Army Reserve)(US rough equivalent is the Army Reserve and National Guard)
 tetchy *  irascible
 thick; thickie  stupid; person of low intelligence.
 throw a wobbly  (informal) to lose one's temper, throw a tantrum
 thruppennies  (rhyming slang) breasts/tits (from thrupenny bits, obsolete British coin)
 tinned  canned as in "tinned soup" or "a tin of tuna"
 tip  a dump or to throw something away
 Tipp-Ex  white tape or liquid used to make corrections of ink on paper (US: Wite-Out)
 tipping [it] down  raining hard
 titbit  a bit of compelling information, or a morsel of tasty food (tidbit in U.S.)
 titchy  very small; tiny (from tich or titch a small person, from Little Tich, the stage name of Harry Relph (1867–1928), English actor noted for his small stature)
 titfer  (rhyming slang) hat (from tit-for-tat)
 [go] tits up  (mildly vulgar) to suddenly go wrong (literally, to fall over. US: go belly up). cf pear-shaped (appears in the US mainly as military jargon, sometimes sanitized to "tango uniform")
 toad-in-the-hole  batter-baked sausages, sausages baked in Yorkshire Pudding
 toff  (slang) member of the upper classes
 toffee apple  a sugar-glazed apple on a stick eaten esp. on Guy Fawkes Night and Hallowe'en (US: caramel apple or candy apple)
 toffee-nosed  antisocial in a pretentious way, stuck up
 Tommy Atkins, Tommy  common term for a British soldier, particularly associated with World War I
 tonk  (informal) to hit hard, sometimes used in cricket to describe a substantial boundary shot: "he tonked it for six". In Southern England can also mean muscular. (US: ripped or buff).
 tosser *  (slang) Largely equivalent to "wanker" but less offensive; has the same literal meaning, i.e. one who masturbates ("tosses off"). (US: jerk).
 tosspot  (colloquial, archaic) a drunkard; also used in the sense of "tosser".
 totty  (informal, offensive to some) sexually alluring woman or women (more recently, also applied to males). Originally a term for a prostitute in the late 19th century.
 tout  usually in the context "ticket tout"; to re-sell tickets, usually to a live event. Verb: to tout, touting. Ticket touts can usually be seen outside a venue prior to the beginning of the event, selling tickets (which may well be fake) cash-in-hand. Known as scalping in the US.
In recent years the US term apartment building has become fashionable to create the distinction between stigmatised public housing projects, and towers built to contain desirable private accommodation. Equally the US word condominium could also be applied to a tower block.
 Trading Standards  local government departments responsible for enforcing laws regulating the conduct of businesses. 
 trainers  training shoes, athletic shoes. (US: sneakers).
 transit, transit van  generic name for a full size panel van, based on the Ford vehicle of the same name, which in Britain dominates the market for such vehicles.
 transport cafe (sometimes "caff")  roadside diner on a highway used primarily by lorry (truck) drivers (US: truckstop)
 treacle  refined black sugar syrup (US: molasses)
 truncheon *  a police officer's weapon (US: nightstick or billy)
 tuppence  two pence, also infantile euphemism for vagina. cf twopenn'orth
 tuppenny-ha'penny  cheap, substandard
 turf accountant  bookmaker for horse races (US and UK: bookie)
 turn-indicator  direction-indicator light on a vehicle (US: turn signal)
 turning  A place where one can turn off a road. Not generally used where the turn would take one onto a more major road or for a crossroads. (US: turn). "drive past the post office and you'll see a small turning to the right, which leads directly to our farm"
 turn-ups an arrangement at the bottom of trouser-legs whereby a deep hem is made, and the material is doubled-back to provide a trough around the external portion of the bottom of the leg. (US: cuffs)
 twee *  excessively cute, quaint, or "precious" (Similar to US cutesy)
 twopenn'orth, tuppenn'orth, tup'en'oth  one's opinion (tuppenn'orth is literally "two pennies worth" or "two pence worth", depending on usage); (US equivalent: two cents' worth, two cents). cf tuppence

U
 Ulster Scots  Inhabitants of Ulster, mostly in modern-day Northern Ireland, whose ancestors were Scottish people who settled there, or residents of Northern Ireland who descend from those settlers (US: Scotch-Irish or Scots-Irish)
 uni  short for university, used much like US college
 up himself/herself  (informal) someone who is stand-offish, stuck-up, snobby. "He's a bit up himself." Euphemistic variation of up his own arse. (US: snotty, full of himself/herself)
 up sticks  (US: pull up stakes)
 up the duff  (informal) pregnant;  Australian in origin

V
 veg  shortened form of vegetable or vegetables. (US: veggie, veggies)
 verger (virger, in some churches)  someone who carries the verge or other emblem of authority before a scholastic, legal, or religious dignitary in a procession; someone who takes care of the interior of a church and acts as an attendant during ceremonies.
 verruca  a wart on one's foot. (US: plantar wart)

W
 WAG  "wives and girlfriends", typically in reference to the significant others of footballers (US soccer players).
 wage packet  weekly employee payment, usually cash though now less commonly given as such (US paycheck)
 wally  (informal) a mild form of idiot or fool (US dummy)
 wanker  (offensive) a masturbator, used generally as a term of abuse in the fashion of the US jagoff or jerk.
 WC  a "water closet", a loo, a public or private toilet without a bath (US bathroom or restroom)
 washing-up liquid liquid detergent used for washing dishes (US dishwashing detergent or liquid, dish soap)
 wazzock  an idiot, popularised (at least in Southern England) by the 1981 song "Capstick Comes Home" by Tony Capstick, originated and historically more common in Northern England
 well extremely, very. "He's well rich" (US "He's way rich")
 Wellingtons, wellies  Wellington boots, waterproof rubber boots named after the Duke of Wellington.
 welly  (informal) effort (e.g.: "Give it some welly" to mean "put a bit of effort into an attempt to do something" US: elbow grease (also UK), oomph); also the singular of "wellies", for Wellington boots (US: gumboots, rubber boots)
 What ho!  (interj.) Hello! (warmly) Now considered old-fashioned and (like "spiffing", above) stereotypically associated with the upper class (and in particular the works of P.G. Wodehouse).
 wheel brace  tool used to remove the nuts/bolts of the wheel of an automobile (US: Lug wrench)
 whilst  A more restricted form of "while" which cannot be used as a noun, verb, or preposition. In the US, "whilst" is old-fashioned and pretentious to the point where it is now only appropriate for creating a dated effect, as in historical fiction.
 whinge  (informal) complain, whine, especially repeated complaining about minor things (e.g. "Stop whingeing" meaning "stop complaining"); cognate with whine, originated in Scottish and Northern English in the 12th century. Hence whinger (derogatory), someone who complains a lot.
 whip-round  an impromptu collection of money. (Uk and US: pass the hat round)
 white coffee  coffee with milk or cream.
 white pudding  oat and fat sausage often eaten at breakfast, common in Ireland and Scotland
 wide boy  see spiv, above
 windbreaker  a series of small connected screens designed to break the wind at the beach, staked into the sand by wooden poles usually with the aid of a rubber mallet 
 windscreen  (US: windshield)
 wing commander  an Air Force officer rank (US: lieutenant-colonel)
 wing mirrors  the external mirrors on a vehicle – though no longer normally attached to the 'wings' (US: fenders) but to the doors (US: sideview mirrors, side mirrors)
 winkle  (slang) childish term for a penis (US: winkie)
 witter  (informal) to continue to talk trivially about a subject long after the audience's interest has gone (assuming there was any interest in the first place). "He wittered on."
 wobbler, wobbly (informal) tantrum
 write-off *  when cost of repair of a damaged asset (usually a car) is not feasible or exceeds its insurance value (US:total loss, totalled; hull loss [for aircraft]) Is also used formally in the context of accounting, including in the US, to mean a permissible deduction applied to offset certain kinds of costs ("a tax write-off").
 wog  (offensive, term of abuse) member of an ethnic minority, especially a brown one. The word can refer to a wide variety of non-Europeans, including Arabs, sub-Saharans Africans (and those of sub-Saharan descent), Iranians, Indians and Pakistanis, and Turks.

Y
 Y-fronts men's briefs with an inverted-Y-shaped frontal flap; originally a trademark (US: briefs or jockey shorts / jockeys; US slang: tighty-whiteys)
 yob, yobbo  lout, young troublemaker (origin: boy spelt backwards)
 yomp  to move on foot across rough terrain carrying heavy amounts of equipment and supplies without mechanised support (Royal Marines slang popularised by the Falklands War of 1982, army equivalent is to tab). Also used informally for any walk across rough ground.
 yonks  a long time, ages. "I've not seen her for yonks." (colloquial)

Z
 zebra crossing  a strip across a road, with wide black and white stripes, where vehicles must stop when pedestrians want to cross (similar to US crosswalk)
 zed  last letter of the alphabet, pronounced "zee" in the U.S.
 Zimmer, Zimmer frame  a trade name for a walking frame, from the American firm Zimmer Holdings. (US, colloquially: walker)

See also
 List of words having different meanings in British and American English: A–L
 List of words having different meanings in British and American English: M–Z
 List of American words not widely used in the United Kingdom
 Cockney rhyming slang

References

Bibliography
 Hargraves, Orin (2002). Mighty Fine Words and Smashing Expressions: Making Sense of Transatlantic English. Oxford: Oxford University Press. .
 Peters, Pam (2004). The Cambridge Guide to English Usage. Cambridge: Cambridge University Press. .

External links
BBC.co.uk, A large project being undertaken by the BBC to document and chart the different word-usage and accents in the British Isles.
British and American terms, Oxford Dictionaries
Effingpot.com An American's guide to speaking British, written by a Brit living in Texas.
Translating American to British A guide to British slang.
American-British/British-American Dictionaries An American to British dictionary and a British to American Dictionary.
The Septic's Companion: A British Slang Dictionary An online dictionary of British slang, viewable alphabetically or by category.

Lists of English words
Lists of English phrases
Words, British, not widely used in the United States, List of
Wikipedia glossaries
Wikipedia glossaries using description lists